Edmond is a city in Norton County, Kansas, United States.  As of the 2020 census, the population of the city was 28.

History
Edmond had a post office from the 1870s until 1996. Edmond was named for Jack Edmond, who offered a supply of flour in exchange for the naming rights.

Geography
Edmond is located at  (39.627105, -99.820722).

Demographics

2010 census
As of the census of 2010, there were 49 people, 23 households, and 15 families residing in the city. The racial makeup of the city was 98.0% White and 2.0% Native American.

There were 23 households, of which 26.1% had children under the age of 18 living with them, 60.9% were married couples living together, 4.3% had a female householder with no husband present, and 34.8% were non-families. 34.8% of all households were made up of individuals, and 4.3% had someone living alone who was 65 years of age or older. The average household size was 2.13 and the average family size was 2.73.

The median age in the city was 43.5 years. 20.4% of residents were under the age of 18; 4.1% were between the ages of 18 and 24; 26.5% were from 25 to 44; 36.8% were from 45 to 64; and 12.2% were 65 years of age or older. The gender makeup of the city was 53.1% male and 46.9% female.

2000 census
As of the census of 2000, there were 47 people, 19 households, and 12 families residing in the city. The racial makeup of the city was 100.00% White. Hispanic or Latino of any race were 4.26% of the population.

There were 19 households, out of which 36.8% had children under the age of 18 living with them, 52.6% were married couples living together, 10.5% had a female householder with no husband present, and 31.6% were non-families. 26.3% of all households were made up of individuals, and 10.5% had someone living alone who was 65 years of age or older. The average household size was 2.47 and the average family size was 3.08.

In the city, the population was spread out, with 34.0% under the age of 18, 31.9% from 25 to 44, 21.3% from 45 to 64, and 12.8% who were 65 years of age or older. The median age was 40 years. For every 100 females, there were 113.6 males. For every 100 females age 18 and over, there were 82.4 males.

The median income for a household in the city was $11,875, and the median income for a family was $28,750. Males had a median income of $25,000 versus $12,500 for females. The per capita income for the city was $7,395. There were 20.0% of families and 25.6% of the population living below the poverty line, including 17.6% of under eighteens and none of those over 64.

Education
The community is served by Norton USD 211 public school district.

References

Further reading

External links
 Edmond - Directory of Public Officials
 Edmond city map, KDOT

Cities in Kansas
Cities in Norton County, Kansas